Vigilante Force is a 2003 Hong Kong modern serial drama produced by TVB starring Bowie Lam, Kenix Kwok, Joe Ma, Benny Chan, Tavia Yeung, Leila Tong, Mak Cheung-ching, and Eileen Yeow.

Cast

Main cast

Police

Other cast

Awards and nominations
TVB Anniversary Awards (2003)
Won: My Top 12 Favourite Television Characters (Bowie Lam)

External links
Official Website 
Official Website (TVBI)

TVB dramas
2003 Hong Kong television series debuts
2003 Hong Kong television series endings